Thunderstruck is a 2004 Australian film directed by Darren Ashton and starring Stephen Curry, Damon Gameau, Ryan Johnson, Callan Mulvey, and Sam Worthington. The title was taken from the AC/DC song of the same name. Its plot concerns five AC/DC fans who make a promise that if one of them died, the other four would have him buried next to grave of their idol, Bon Scott. When one of them dies, the remaining four embark on a road trip to fulfill their promise.

Plot
Ben, Sonny, Lloyd, Sam and Ronnie are friends from Sydney who are all big fans of AC/DC. After a near death experience, the five make a pact that if one among them died the other four would be bury him next to the grave of their idol, the late AC/DC frontman, Bon Scott. Twelve years pass and the five friends have each gone their own ways. When Ronnie dies from being struck by a lightning bolt while playing golf, the remaining four unite and decide to fulfill the promise they made together long ago. They retrieve Ronnie's cremated remains and embark on a road trip to Fremantle (where Bon Scott's ashes were scattered) to scatter his ashes over Fremantle Cemetery.

Cast
 Stephen Curry as Ben
 Damon Gameau as Sonny
 Ryan Johnson as Lloyd
 Callan Mulvey as Sam
 Sam Worthington as Ronnie
 Roy Billing as Tiny

Reception 
On review aggregator Rotten Tomatoes the film has a score of 57% based on reviews from seven critics, with an average 5.3/10 rating.

Box office
Thunderstruck grossed $908,294 at the box office in Australia.

See also
 Cinema of Australia
 South Australian Film Corporation

References

External links
 

2004 films
2004 comedy films
Australian comedy films
Australian rock music films
AC/DC
Films shot in Sydney
Films shot in South Australia
2000s English-language films
2000s Australian films